Alisson Pelegrini Safira (born 17 March 1995), simply known as Alisson Safira or only Safira, is a Brazilian footballer who plays for Vitória S.C. as a forward.

Career statistics

References

External links

1995 births
Living people
Brazilian footballers
Association football forwards
Campeonato Brasileiro Série B players
Foz do Iguaçu Futebol Clube players
Londrina Esporte Clube players
Grêmio Esportivo Novorizontino players
Belenenses SAD players
Primeira Liga players
Brazilian expatriate footballers
Expatriate footballers in Portugal
Brazilian expatriate sportspeople in Portugal